Statistics from the 2015–16 Santos Laguna season.

Squad

First-team squad

For recent transfers, see List of Mexican football transfers summer 2015.

Out on loan

Non-competitive

Competitive

Liga MX

CONCACAF Champions League

Group stage

Quarter final

Semi final

References 

 
2015–16
Santos